The Advisory Circle is an alias of English electronic musician Cate Brooks (formerly known as Jon Brooks) along with King of Woolworths. Her releases as The Advisory Circle are on the Ghost Box Music label.

The Advisory Circle's first release was Mind How You Go, issued as a 3" CD in 2005.

An extensive feature in The Wire magazine explored Brooks' fascination with public information films from the 1970s. They describe their sound as "Everything's fine, but there is something not quite right about it."

Cate Brooks also releases music, under her own name and a variety of alter-egos, with similar musical influences (such as soundtrack music and library music), emotional atmospheres, and conceptual themes to The Advisory Circle material, through the Clay Pipe Music label, own label Café Kaput, and the band The Pattern Forms (in collaboration with Ed Macfarlane and Edd Gibson of Friendly Fires).

Discography
As The Advisory Circle:
2005 Mind How You Go (CD-R, mini-album)
2008 Other Channels (CD)
2011 As The Crow Flies (CD)
 2014 From Out Here (CD)
 2018 Ways of Seeing (CD, LP, download) 
 2022 Full Circle (CD, LP, download)

As King Of Woolworths:
2001 Ming Star (album) (CD)
2003 L'Illustration Musicale (album) (CD)
2004 Rediffusion (album) (CD)

References

External links
Ghost Box Music page

Ghost Box Music artists
Ambient musicians
English electronic musicians
Living people
Year of birth missing (living people)